Nasrollah Dehnavi  (Persian:نصرالله دهنوی, born 23 June 1950 in Masjed Soleiman, Khuzestan, Iran) is a retired Iranian weightlifter. He competed in the 1968 and 1972 Olympics. He won a Bronze medal at the 1974 world championships and set one world Record in Press.
Dehnavi now resides in Tehran, Iran

Career 
He has Participated in competitions 12 years as a member of Iran Weightlifting National Team. After finishing his career he was 14 years coached National Iran Weightlifting Team.

Early life 
He is also a member of Kharazmi University Science Board.
These days Dehnavi is Supervisor of National Weightlifting Team from NOC of Islamic republic of Iran.

Weightlifting achievements

World Weightlifting Championships 

       1969 Warsaw, Poland Lightweight: Press, Gold (140)
       1970 Columbus, Ohio Lightweight: Total Bronze (420)
       1971 Lima, Peru Lightweight: Press, Silver (140), Cl& Jerk, Silver (165) 
       1972 Munich, West Germany Lightweight: Press, Silver (150)
       1974 Manila, Philippines Lightweight: Snatch Silver (130), Total Bronze (295)

Asian Games 

   1970 Bangkok  Lightweight Gold Medal (425)
   1974 Tehran Lightweight Silver Medal (290)

Asian Weightlifting Championships

 1971 Manila, Philippines Lightweight: Gold (425)
 1977 Baghdad Iraq Lightweight: Silver

Note:

 Olympic Games 1968, 1972 and 1976 counted as World Championships too.
 No medals for individual lifts before 1969.
 Press was removed from Olympic weightlifting after 1972.

World Records 
      Lift Type: Press, Result: 146 kg, Date: 11/11/1970, Weight Class: Lightweight (67.5 kg), Location: Teheran

Participate in Olympics Games and results
 Mexico City 1968 Rank: 6th:   
 Munich 1972 Rank: 5th:

References

www.sports-reference.com
chidlovski.net

External links
 https://www.facebook.com/Nasrollah.Dehnavi

1950 births
Living people
World Weightlifting Championships medalists
Iranian male weightlifters
Olympic weightlifters of Iran
Weightlifters at the 1968 Summer Olympics
Weightlifters at the 1972 Summer Olympics
Asian Games gold medalists for Iran
Asian Games silver medalists for Iran
Asian Games medalists in weightlifting
Weightlifters at the 1970 Asian Games
Weightlifters at the 1974 Asian Games
Medalists at the 1970 Asian Games
Medalists at the 1974 Asian Games
People from Masjed Soleyman
Sportspeople from Khuzestan province